Refuge de Rosuel is a refuge of Savoie, France. It lies in the Massif de la Vanoise range. It has an altitude of 1556  metres above sea level.

Mountain huts in the Alps
Mountain huts in France